Box Office Poison is a series of comic books (originally published by Antarctic Press) by Alex Robinson. It was published in collected form by Top Shelf Productions in 2001. The story concerns the life and trials of a group of young people in New York City.

The French edition won the Prix du premier album (Prize for First Comic Book) at the 2005 Angoulême International Comics Festival.

The A.V. Club named Box Office Poison one of the best comics of the decade. Top 100 Graphic Novels named it as the 84th best comic ever made.

Publication history 
Box Office Poison originally appeared in comic book form by Antarctic Press, which published 
21 issues plus a special from October 1996 to October 2000.

The collected Box Office Poison is over 600 pages long. Robinson stated that serializing such a long story in black-and-white form was inspired by Dave Sim's Cerebus.

Box Office Poison has been translated into Spanish, titled Malas Ventas; Portuguese, titled Fracasso de Publico; French, titled De mal en pis, and Greek.

In 2003, Top Shelf published BOP!: More Box Office Poison, a collection of previously published stories that had not been included in the 2001 trade paperback, plus a few new stories.

Characters
Box Office Poison features a wide array of major, supporting, and minor characters from many walks of life.

Lead characters
Sherman Davies, a bookstore clerk. His hatred of his job is never quite enough to get him to quit.
Ed Velasquez: Sherman's friend, who laments never having had a girlfriend for the better part of the series. Ed has aspirations of being a major cartoonist, which are hampered by the various twists and turns of the industry. Marries Hildy at the end of the series.
Beatrice Dorothy Lestrade, who goes exclusively by her middle name.  She works as a writer at a magazine and is Sherman's girlfriend throughout the book.
Stephen Gaedel, history professor. Sherman rents a room in Stephen's apartment.
Jane Pekar, cartoonist, and Stephen's longtime girlfriend. Her hatred for Dorothy is a recurring characteristic. Also, her last name appears to reference famous underground comics writer Harvey Pekar.
Irving Flavor, a cartoonist and creator of the fantastically popular 'Nightstalker' character. With some help from Ed, he is coaxed into fighting Zoom Comics, the owner of the Nightstalker, for some payback on the profitable franchise.
Hildy Kierkegaard, beleaguered assistant of comics writer Archie Pupkin III. She strikes up a friendship with Ed that turns into a romance, and eventually they get married.

Supporting characters
"The Dragon", Sherman's bookstore supervisor. She calls him into her office multiple times to reprimand him against various mess-ups.
Sora Tweed, owner of the apartment building Sherman lives in. She ultimately dies of a heart attack.

Minor characters
Emil and Mora Yossarian, residents of the aforementioned apartment building. Their last name appears to be a nod to Joseph Heller's Catch-22, featuring a man named Yossarian (and whose first name is later revealed to be John). The book Catch-22 is featured later in the story, reinforcing this idea. Emil appears to be on probation. The Yossarians have a dog and a baby.

Awards
The 608-page volume of the series was nominated for the Harvey Award for Best Graphic Album of Previously Published Work in 2002, and an Eisner Award, Ignatz Award and a Firecracker Award in 2001 and 2002. The French version of Box Office Poison, called De Mal En Pis, won the Prix Du Premier Album at the Angoulême International Comics Festival in 2005.

Popular culture references
Box Office Poison references a large body of media. Below is a partial list:

Betty Boop
Billie Holiday
Blondie
Breakfast of Champions
Catch-22
Cerebus
Dick Tracy
Eightball
Hamlet
Jailbird
Jeopardy!
Judge Judy
Laurel and Hardy
Lolita
Newsradio
Peanuts
The Simpsons
Sophie's World
South Park
Spinal Tap
Star Trek
Star Wars
Teenage Mutant Ninja Turtles
The Beatles
The Catcher in the Rye
The Jungle Book
The Kids in the Hall
Twelfth Night
Venus on the Half-Shell
Wallace and Gromit
Where's Waldo?

Notes

External links
 
Box Office Poison website

2001 books
Top Shelf Productions titles
Comics by Alex Robinson
1996 comics debuts